Martin Petersen (born 28 February 1985) is a German football referee who is based in Stuttgart. He referees for VfL Stuttgart of the Württemberg Football Association.

Refereeing career
Petersen, referee of the club VfL Stuttgart, passed his refereeing test in 2000 and officiated in the Bezirksliga starting in 2001, where he also was active as an assistant referee. In 2002, he began to referee matches in the Landesliga Württemberg, becoming the youngest Landesliga referee of all time in Württemberg. From 2005 onwards, he took over officiating in the Verbandsliga Württemberg, before moving a year later to the Oberliga Baden-Württemberg. In 2008, he began officiating in the Regionalliga Süd, before he began officiating on the DFB level in 2009, starting in the 3. Liga. At the same time, Petersen was also active as an assistant in the 2. Bundesliga. In 2011, he began officiating in the 2. Bundesliga, and also became active as an assistant in Bundesliga.

On 10 August 2015, Petersen was hit in the head by a lighter in the 71st minute during the 2015–16 DFB-Pokal match between VfL Osnabrück and RB Leipzig. The match was stopped, with VfL Osnabrück leading 1–0, with the match abandoned shortly thereafter. On 11 August it was announced that Petersen suffered a slight concussion.

In 2017, Petersen was one of four referees promoted to officiate in the Bundesliga for the 2017–18 season.

Personal life
Petersen lives in Stuttgart, where he works as a real estate broker.

References

External links
 Profile at dfb.de 
 Profile at worldfootball.net

1985 births
Living people
People from Filderstadt
Sportspeople from Stuttgart (region)
German football referees